Shur Malla also known as Sura Malla was the eighth king of the Mallabhum. He ruled from 775 to 795 CE.

History
Shur Malla Conquered Bagri area of Mednipur and that was included in Mallabhum.

References

Sources
 

Malla rulers
Kings of Mallabhum
8th-century Indian monarchs
Mallabhum